Turf is a five-issue comic book limited series, written by Jonathan Ross, illustrated by Tommy Lee Edwards and published by American company Image Comics. It was later serialised in CLiNT, before being collected.

Plot summary
The narrative is set in 1920s Prohibition-era New York and features period typical gangsters alongside vampires and aliens. Ross himself, describes the comic as "An intelligent popcorn movie. lots of action, lots of setting, lots of cool ideas, but with an emotional heart to it".

Reception
The first 20,000 copies of issue 1 sold out on pre-orders alone. In interview, Ross has said that he intends the mini-series to run for five issues, eventually being released in a hardback collection and potentially a film adaptation, to be made by Matthew Vaughn.

Film adaptation
In 2011, Benderspink has optioned a film adaptation of Turf.

Collected editions
The series was collected into a single volume:

Turf (180 pages, hardcover, Images Comics, August 2011, Titan Books, September 2011)

References

Sources

External links

Image Comics vampires